Tuwati II was the third attested ruler of the kingdom of Tabal in Anatolia, in what is now Turkey. He ruled sometime in the mid 8th century BC and was succeeded by his son, Wasusarma.

References 

Hittite kings